Eclogavena quadrimaculata, the four-spotted cowry, is a species of sea snail, a cowry, a marine gastropod mollusk in the family Cypraeidae, the cowries.

Subspecies
Eclogavena quadrimaculata quadrimaculata (Gray, 1824)
Eclogavena quadrimaculata thielei Schilder & Schilder, 1938

Description
The surface of these cylindrical shells may be whitish, pale grey or pale blue, with many small brown flecks and with two large rather triangular dark brown spots at each end (hence the common name and the Latin species name quadrimaculata). These shells are completely white or pale yellowish underneath. Teeth are raised, not coloured and spread right across base up to the margin. The living animal shows a dark brown or black mantle with small white or pinkish spots.

Distribution
This species is present in Australia (Northern Territory, Queensland) and Philippines. These cowries can be found under rocks and among coral rubble.

Gallery

References

 Gray, J.E. 1824. Monograph on the family Cypraeidae, a family of testaceous Mollusca. Zoological Journal of London 1: 367-391
 Dillwyn, L.W. 1827. Remarks on the Cypraea described by Gray. Zoological Journal of London 3: 315-317
 Schilder, F.A. & Schilder, M. 1939. Prodrome of a monograph on living Cypraeidae. Proceedings of the Malacological Society of London 23: 119-231
 Burgess, C.M. 1985. Cowries of the World. Cape Town : Seacomber Publications 289 pp.
 Lorenz, F. & Hubert, A. 2000. A Guide to Worldwide Cowries. Hackenheim, Germany : ConchBooks pp. 1–584.
 Meyer, C.P. 2004. Toward comprehensiveness: increased molecular sampling within Cypraeidae and its phylogenetic implications. Malacologia 46(1): 127-156
 Meyer, C. 2005. Eclogavena quadrimaculata quadrimaculata Gray, 1824. Cowrie Genetic Database Project. 2005

External links
 Conchology
 Animal Base

Bibliography
 A. Robin - Encyclopedia of Marine Gastropods, p 95/9
 Felix Lorenz and A. Hubert - Guide to Worldwide Cowries, p 367/25-27, 31-33
 Philippine Marine Molluscs, Vol. 1, p 102; Pl. 140/2, 4, 6
 Robertson, R. (1981). List of shell-bearing mollusks observed and collected at Lizard Island, Great Barrier Reef, Australia, Tryonia, 4: 1-32. LIRS catalog number 403
 Tan Siong Kiat and Henrietta P. M. Woo, 2010 Preliminary Checklist of The Molluscs of Singapore (pdf), Raffles Museum of Biodiversity Research, National University of Singapore
 Wilson, B. (1993). Australian Marine Shells: 1. Prosobranch gastropods. Odyssey Publishing, Kallaroo, Western Australia.
 Liu J.Y. [Ruiyu] (ed.). (2008). Checklist of marine biota of China seas. China Science Press. 1267 pp.

Cypraeidae
Gastropods described in 1824
Taxa named by John Edward Gray